Srinivas Raju is an Indian film director who works in Kannada and Telugu-language cinema. He made his directorial debut with the 2010 Kannada film, Nannavanu. He then followed it up with the Dandupalya franchise, consisting of: Dandupalya (2012), Dandupalya 2 (2017), and Dandupalya 3 (2018). The franchise was written and directed by him. He also directed Kannada actor, Upendra, in Shivam (2015).

As a director

References 

Living people
Kannada film directors
Film directors from Bangalore
Screenwriters from Bangalore
21st-century Indian film directors
Kannada screenwriters
1971 births